James Knight, Jr. (born c. 1840) was a Scottish amateur golfer. Knight placed fifth in the 1862 Open Championship.

Early life
Knight was born circa 1840 in Scotland.

Golf career

1862 Open Championship
The 1862 Open Championship was the third Open Championship and was again held at Prestwick Golf Club, Ayrshire, Scotland. Four professionals and four amateurs contested the event, with Tom Morris, Sr. winning the championship for the second time, by 13 shots from Willie Park, Sr.

Death
The date of death of Knight is unknown.

References

Scottish male golfers
Amateur golfers